1741 Giclas is a stony Koronis asteroid from the outer region of the asteroid belt, approximately 13 kilometers in diameter. It was discovered on 26 January 1960, by IU's Indiana Asteroid Program at Goethe Link Observatory near Brooklyn, Indiana, United States. It is named for astronomer Henry L. Giclas.

Orbit and classification 

The S-type asteroid is a member of the Koronis family, a group consisting of about 200 known bodies. It orbits the Sun in the outer main-belt at a distance of 2.7–3.1 AU once every 4 years and 11 months (1,789 days). Its orbit has an eccentricity of 0.07 and an inclination of 3° with respect to the ecliptic. Its first used observation was taken at Goethe Link Observatory in 1953, extending the body's observation arc by 7 years prior to its official discovery observation.

Physical characteristics

Rotation period 

Between 2004 and 2014, several lightcurves of Giclas gave a rotation period between 2.92 and 3.107 hours with an brightness variation between 0.10 and 0.15 magnitude.

Diameter and albedo 

According to the surveys carried out by the Japanese Akari satellite and NASA's Wide-field Infrared Survey Explorer with its subsequent NEOWISE mission, Giclas measures 12.50 and 15.06 kilometers in diameter, and its surface has an albedo in the range of 0.260 to 0.374.

The Collaborative Asteroid Lightcurve Link assumes an albedo of 0.24 and calculates a diameter of 13.60 kilometers with an absolute magnitude of 11.5.

Naming 

This minor planet was named in honour of American astronomer Henry Lee Giclas (1910–2007), longtime staff member of the Lowell Observatory in Flagstaff, Arizona, where he discovered 17 minor planets and the comet 84P/Giclas. Giclas responsibility included the programs of minor planet positions and stellar proper motions, using the 13-inch Lawrence Lowell Telescope. The official  was published by the Minor Planet Center on 20 February 1976.

Notes

References

External links 
 Asteroid Lightcurve Database (LCDB), query form (info )
 Dictionary of Minor Planet Names, Google books
 Asteroids and comets rotation curves, CdR – Observatoire de Genève, Raoul Behrend
 Discovery Circumstances: Numbered Minor Planets (1)-(5000) – Minor Planet Center
 
 

001741
001741
Named minor planets
19600126